Super Pig may refer to:
Super Pig (book), a 1976 book by William Rushton
Saban Entertainment's English version of Pig Girl of Love and Courage: Tonde Burin